Here Comes the Judge is an album by American jazz saxophonist Eddie Harris recorded in 1964 and released on the Columbia label.

Track listing
All compositions by Eddie Harris except as indicated
 "East End Blues" – 2:23 
 "Deep in a Dream" (Eddie De Lange, Jimmy Van Heusen) – 5:04 
 "Goldfinger" (John Barry, Leslie Bricusse, Anthony Newley) – 3:33 
 "People" (Bob Merrill, Jule Styne) – 3:02 
 "What's New?" (Johnny Burke, Bob Haggart) – 3:21 
 "Rice Pudding" – 3:12 
 "Ineffable" (Jimmy Heath) – 2:55 
 "That's Tough" – 6:18

Personnel
Eddie Harris – tenor saxophone
Unnamed additional musicians

References 

Eddie Harris albums
1964 albums
Columbia Records albums
Albums produced by Tom Wilson (record producer)